Elisa Oricchio (born 1979) is an Italian cancer researcher and Associate Professor at École Polytechnique Fédérale de Lausanne. She discovered that EphA7 activates the tumor suppressor gene for patients with follicular lymphoma and was awarded the Lorini Foundation Award and Blavatnik Award for Young Scientists for her discovery.

Biography
Elisa Oricchio was born in 1979 and grew up in Cilento, Italy. She earned a bachelor's degree and went on to attain a master's degree in biology from Sapienza University of Rome. In 2008, she earned her PhD in Medical Microbiology and Immunology from the University of Rome Tor Vergata. Oricchio moved to the United States almost immediately to begin her post-doctorate research at Memorial Sloan Kettering Cancer Center in New York City. In her research, she identified in 2011 that tumor cells treated with pure EphA7, an anti-tumor protein, died, which was a significant discovery in a rarely researched field. Her discovery was awarded with a grant from Sloan Kettering and a Fellowship from the Lymphoma Research Foundation to make further studies of follicular lymphoma. In addition to the research funds, she received the Lorini Foundation Award on 7 May 2012 in Milan, Italy and the Blavatnik Award for Young Scientists in New York City, the same year.

In 2012, her research identified that nearly 70% of patients with follicular lymphoma have lost the EphA7 receptor and she was experimenting with methods of reintroducing the protein into the cells. Because there has been no cure success with traditional chemotherapies, Oricchio's work has repeatedly been funded. She was awarded a second Fellowship from the Leukemia and Lymphoma Society and a grant from the US National Institutes of Health. In 2013, she was awarded with a plaque from the town of Vallo della Lucania in her home region of Italy for her research, which was successful in developing a mouse model. In 2014, she was hired by the Swiss Federal Institute of Technology as a researcher and to support creation of the new Swiss Cancer Center in Lausanne at the Lausanne University Hospital. The Swiss Institute for Experimental Cancer Research created an endowed Chair in Translational Oncology for Oricchio and effective 1 November 2014, she became a tenured Assistant Professor at the École Polytechnique Fédérale de Lausanne, School of Life Sciences. In September 2021, she was promoted Associate Professor.

Selected publications

References

External links 
WorldCat Publications
PubFacts Scientific Research Publications List

1979 births
21st-century biologists
21st-century Italian scientists
21st-century women scientists
Italian biologists
Italian women biologists
Living people
Sapienza University of Rome alumni
University of Rome Tor Vergata alumni
Academic staff of the École Polytechnique Fédérale de Lausanne
Cancer researchers
21st-century Italian women